Dendrogastridae is a family of crustaceans belonging to the order Dendrogastrida.

Genera:
 Bifurgaster Stone & Moyse, 1985
 Dendrogaster Knipovich, 1890
 Laocoon Nierstrasz & Entz, 1922
 Ulophysema Brattström, 1936

References

Maxillopoda
Crustacean families